Year 1568 (MDLXVIII) was a leap year starting on Thursday (link will display the full calendar) of the Julian calendar.

Events

January–June 
 January 6–13 – In the Eastern Hungarian Kingdom, the delegates of Unio Trium Nationum to the Diet of Torda make Europe's first declaration of religious freedom, adopted on January 28 as the Edict of Torda.
 February 17 – Treaty of Adrianople (sometimes called the Peace of Adrianople): The Habsburgs agree to pay tribute to the Ottomans.
 March 23 – The Peace of Longjumeau ends the Second War of Religion in France.  Again Catherine de' Medici and Charles IX make substantial concessions to the Huguenots.
 May 2 – Mary, Queen of Scots, escapes from Loch Leven Castle.
 May 13 –  Battle of Langside: The forces of Mary, Queen of Scots are defeated by a confederacy of Scottish Protestants, under James Stewart, Earl of Moray, her half-brother.
 May 16 –  Mary, Queen of Scots, flees to England.
 May 19 – Queen Elizabeth I of England arrests Mary, Queen of Scots.
 May 23 – Battle of Heiligerlee: Troops under Louis of Nassau, brother of William I of Orange, defeat a smaller loyalist force under the Duke of Arenberg, in an attempt to invade the Northern Netherlands.  This  effectively begins the Eighty Years' War.

July–December 
 July 21 – Battle of Jemmingen: The main Spanish army of the Duke of Alba utterly defeats Louis of Nassau's invading army, in the Northeastern Netherlands.
 August 18 – The Third War of Religion begins in France, after an unsuccessful attempt by the Royalists to capture Condé and Coligny, the Huguenot leaders.
 September 24 – Battle of San Juan de Ulúa (Anglo-Spanish War): In the Gulf of Mexico, a Spanish fleet forces English privateers under John Hawkins to end their campaign.
 September 29 – The Swedish king Eric XIV is deposed by his half-brothers John and Charles. John proclaims himself king John III the next day.
 October 5 – William I of Orange invades the southeastern Netherlands.
 October 20 – Battle of Jodoigne: Spanish forces under the Duke of Alba destroy Orange's rearguard. Orange abandons his offensive.

Date unknown 
 The Russo-Turkish War begins in Astrakhan.
 Ashikaga Yoshiaki is installed as Shōgun, beginning the Azuchi–Momoyama period in Japan.
 Akbar the Great of the Mughal Empire besieges and captures the massive Chittor Fort, in northern India.
 Polybius' The Histories are first translated into English, by Christopher Watson.
 Huguenots besiege Chartres.
 A Spanish expedition under Álvaro de Mendaña de Neira discovers the Solomon Islands.
 Álvaro I succeeds his stepfather Henrique I as ruler of the Kingdom Kongo forming the Kwilu dynasty that ruled the kingdom without interruption until  May 1622

Births 

 January 6 – Henri Spondanus, French historian (d. 1643)
 January 14 – Johannes Hartmann, German chemist (d. 1631)
 January 20 – Daniel Cramer, German theologian (d. 1637)
 January 28 – Gustav of Sweden, Swedish prince (d. 1607)
 January 30 – Countess Katharina of Hanau-Lichtenberg (d. 1636)
 February 2 – Péter Révay, Hungarian historian (d. 1622)
 February 11 – Honoré d'Urfé, French writer (d. 1625)
 March 9 – Aloysius Gonzaga, Italian Jesuit and saint (d. 1591)
 March 16 – Juan Martínez Montañés, Spanish sculptor (d. 1649)
 March 28 – Johannes Polyander, Dutch theologian (d. 1646)
 March 30 – Henry Wotton, English author and diplomat (d. 1639)
 April 5 – Pope Urban VIII (d. 1644)
 April 17 – George Brooke, English aristocrat (d. 1603)
 April 21 – Frederick II, Duke of Holstein-Gottorp (d. 1587)
 April 28 – Teodósio II, Duke of Braganza, Portuguese nobleman and father of João IV of Portugal (d. 1630)
 May 9 – Guglielmo Caccia, Italian painter (d. 1625)
 May 11 – Christian I, Prince of Anhalt-Bernburg, German prince of the House of Ascania (d. 1630)
 May 17 – Anna Vasa of Sweden, Swedish princess (d. 1625)
 May 29 – Virginia de' Medici, Duchess of Modena and Reggio (d. 1615)
 June 6 – Sophie of Brandenburg, Regent of Saxony (1591–1601) (d. 1622)
 June 25 – Gunilla Bielke, Queen of Sweden (d. 1597)
 July 1 – Philip Sigismund of Brunswick-Wolfenbüttel, German Catholic bishop (d. 1623)
 August 27 – Hercule, Duke of Montbazon (d. 1654)
 September 3 – Adriano Banchieri, Italian composer (d. 1634)
 September 5 – Tommaso Campanella, Italian theologian and poet (d. 1639)
 October 2 – Marino Ghetaldi, Croatian mathematician and physicist (d. 1626)
 October 18 – Henry Wallop, English politician (d. 1642)
 November 18 – Augustus the Elder, Duke of Brunswick-Lüneburg, Lutheran Bishop of Ratzeburg (d. 1636)
 December 17 – Jonathan Trelawny, English politician (d. 1604)
 December 25 – John Guy, English merchant venturer and first Governor of Newfoundland (d. 1629)
 date unknown
 Nikolaus Ager, French botanist (d. 1634)
 John Welsh of Ayr, Scottish Presbyterian leader
 Barnabe Barnes, English poet (d. 1609)
 Edward Chichester, 1st Viscount Chichester (d. 1648)
 Nakagawa Hidemasa, Japanese military leader (d. 1592)
 Fernando de Alva Cortés Ixtlilxóchitl, Mexican historian (d. 1648)
 Gervase Markham, English poet and writer (d. 1637)
 Edward Somerset, 4th Earl of Worcester (d. 1628)
 Robert Wintour, English conspirator (executed 1606)
 Wei Zhongxian, Grand Secretary of China (d. 1627)
 Ōtsu Ono, Japanese woman poet, koto, and writer (believed to have learned how to write from Nobutada Konoe) (d. 1568)

Deaths 

 January 26 – Lady Catherine Grey, Countess of Hertford (b. 1540)
 February 15 – Hendrick van Brederode, Dutch reformer (b. 1531)
 March 20
 Albert, Duke of Prussia (b. 1490)
 Anna Marie of Brunswick-Lüneburg, Duchess of Prussia (b. 1532)
 March 19 – Elizabeth Seymour, Lady Cromwell, English noblewoman (b.c. 1518))
 May 23 – Adolf of Nassau, Count of Nassau, Dutch soldier (b. 1540)
 April 7 – Onofrio Panvinio, Italian Augustinian historian (b. 1529)
 April 27 – Giovanni Michele Saraceni, Italian Catholic cardinal (b. 1498)
 May 6 – Bernardo Salviati, Italian Catholic cardinal (b. 1508)
 May 15 – Anna of Lorraine (b. 1522)
 May 23 – Jean de Ligne, Duke of Arenberg (b. 1528)
 June 3 – Andrés de Urdaneta, Spanish explorer (b. 1508)
 June 5
 Lamoral, Count of Egmont, Flemish statesman (b. 1522)
 Philip de Montmorency, Count of Horn (b. c. 1524)
 June 11 – Henry V, Duke of Brunswick-Lüneburg and Prince of Wolfenbüttel 1514–1568 (b. 1489)
 July 1 – Levinus Lemnius, Dutch writer (b. 1505)
 July 6 – Johannes Oporinus, Swiss printer (b. 1507)
 July 7 – William Turner, British ornithologist and botanist (b. 1508)
 July 24 – Carlos, Prince of Asturias, son of Philip II of Spain (b. 1545)
 August 15 – Stanislaus Kostka, Polish saint (b. 1550)
 August 21 – Jean Parisot de Valette, 49th Grandmaster of the Knights Hospitaller (b. 1495)
 August 23 – Thomas Wharton, 1st Baron Wharton (b. 1495)
 September 26 – Leonor de Cisneros, Spanish Protestant (b. 1536)
 September – Anna Pehrsönernas moder, influential Swedish courtier (b. year unknown)
 September – Jöran Persson, Swedish politician (b. c. 1530) (executed)
 October 3 – Elisabeth of Valois, Queen of Philip II of Spain (b. 1545)
 October 14 – Jacques Arcadelt, Flemish composer (b. 1504)
 October 19 – Joannes Aurifaber Vratislaviensis, German theologian (b. 1517)
 October 28 – Ashikaga Yoshihide, Japanese shōgun (b. 1538)
 November 6 
 November 9 – John Radcliffe, English politician (b. 1539)
 Herman of Kazan and Svyazhsk, Archbishop of Kazan and later Metropolitan of Moscow
 Anna of Brunswick-Lüneburg, duchess consort of Pomerania (b. 1502)
 December 23 – Roger Ascham, tutor of Elizabeth I of England (b. 1515)
 December 24 – Henry V, Burgrave of Plauen (b. 1533)
 December 28 – Christoph, Duke of Württemberg (b. 1515)
 December 31 – Shimazu Tadayoshi, Japanese warlord (b. 1493)
 date unknown
 Henry Sutton Dudley, English soldier and sailor (b. 1517)
 Garcia de Orta, Portuguese Jewish physician (b. 1501)
 Dirk Philips, early Dutch Anabaptist writer and theologian (b. 1504)
 Yan Song, Chinese prime minister (b. 1481)
 Amato Lusitano, Portuguese physician (b. 1511)

References